The Legacy Bowl was an exhibition college football game played in Osaka, Japan on March 21, 2015 between Princeton University and Kwansei Gakuin University. Princeton was invited to play by Kwansei Gakuin.

Teams

Kwansei Gakuin
Kwansei Gakuin wore its blue jerseys.

Princeton

Princeton wore its white jerseys.

References

External links
  (Japanese)
  (English)

American football in Japan
Princeton Tigers football games
2015 in Japanese sport
2015 college football season
March 2015 sports events in Japan